There are three species of snake named olive keelback:
 Atretium schistosum, olive keelback wart snake
 Trimerodytes percarinatus, species in the subfamily Natricinae
 Helicops modestus, species in the subfamily Dipsadinae